Hilal Chouman (Arabic:  هلال شومان) (born 1982) is a Lebanese novelist and writer. He was born in Beirut and studied communications and electronics engineering at Jâmi'at Bâyrut Al-Arabiya. He then obtained an MSc in aerospace communication systems and satellite communications. He now lives and works in Toronto. 

Chouman has written four novels in Arabic: 
 Stories of Sleep (2008) 
 Napolitana (2010)
 Limbo Beirut (2012) - translated by Anna Ziajka Stanton and nominated for the PEN Translation Prize (2017) and the Saif Ghobash Banipal Prize (2017)
 Once Upon a Time, Tomorrow (2016)

References

Lebanese writers
1982 births
Living people